Jane is a feminine given name. It is the English form of  Jehanne, the Old French feminine form of Iohannes, a Latin form of the Greek name  (Iōannēs), which is ultimately derived from the Hebrew name יוֹחָנָן (Yochanan), a short form of the name יְהוֹחָנָן (Yehochanan), meaning "Yahweh is merciful".

The name was first used in large numbers in the mid-16th century for the daughters of aristocrats as an alternative to the more commonplace Joan. The two names have alternated in popularity. In the early 19th century, Jane rose in popular use in association with its perceived glamour. Joan became more popular in the early to mid-20th century, when it was ranked in the top 500 most popular names given to girls in the United States, but it has again been displaced by Jane on the popularity charts in the 21st century.

Name variants

Alternate forms include: 
Asia (Polish, Italian)
Gianna (Italian)
Gianetta (Italian)
Giannetta (Italian)
Giannina (Italian)
Giovanna (Italian)
Hana (Czech)
Janka (Hungarian)
Hanne (German)
Hannele (Finnish)
Hannie (Dutch)
Hansine (German)
Hansje, Hanna, Hannie (Dutch)
Ioana (Romanian)
Ioanna (Greek, Russian)
Ionna (Greek)
Ionela (Romanian)
Iva (Slavic, Portuguese)
Ivana (Czech, Croatian)
Ivanna (Russian, Slavic)
Ivanka (Czech)
Ivanka (Czech, Slavic)
Jaana (Finnish)
Jaapje (Dutch)
Jana (Czech, Latvian, Polish, Slovak, Albanian)
Janae (Modern American, English)
Janeczka (Polish)
Jane (Estonian)
Jane (Circassian: Жьанэ and Джэнэ)
Jane (Macedonian: Јане)
Janelle (American)
Janes (Danish, Dutch, Finnish, Swedish)
Janet (English, Scots)
Janete (Portuguese)
Janice (English, Portuguese)
Janica (Czech)
Janina (Polish)
Janine (French, English, Portuguese)
Janka (Czech, Hungarian)
Janna (Dutch, English, Swedish)
Janne (Norwegian)
Janneke (Dutch)
Janneth (Scots)
Jannetje (Dutch)
Jannie (Dutch)
Jannike (Scandinavian)
Janotje (Dutch)
Jans (Hebrew)
Jansje (Dutch)
Jante (Dutch)
Jantina (Dutch)
Jantine (Dutch)
Jantje (Dutch)
Januszy (Slavic)
Jasia (Polish)
Jayna (English)
Jayne (English)
Jean (English, Scots)
Jeanette (French)
Jeanna (English)
Jeanne (French)
Jeannie (English, Scots)
Jehanne (French)
Jenica (Romanian)
Jenka (Czech)
Jenne (Dutch)
Jennet (Scots)
Jenni (English)
Jennie (English)
Jenny (English)
Jenjira (Thailand)
Jensine (Danish, Norwegian)
Jinn (Manx)
Jinty (Scots)
Joan (English, Manx)
Joana (Catalan, Portuguese)
Joanka (Polish)
Joanna (English, Polish)
Joanne (English)
Joannia (Manx)
Joasia (Polish)
Johana (Dutch)
Johanka (Czech)
Johanna (Czech, Danish, Dutch, German, Norwegian, Swedish, Hungarian)
Jóhanna (Icelandic)
Johanne (Danish, Norwegian)
Johanneke (Dutch)
Johna (English)
Johnet (Manx)
Johnna (English)
Johnnie (English)
Joan (English)
Joina (Danish)
Jóna (Icelandic)
Jone (Basque)
Jonee (Manx)
Joney (Manx)
Jonie (English)
Jovana
Jovanka
Juana (Spanish)
Juanita (Spanish)
Jutta (German)
Kini (Hawaiian)
Nana
Oana (Romanian)
Ohanna (Armenian)
Seanna (English)
Seini (Tongan)
Seona (Scots)
Seonag (Scottish Gaelic)
Seónaid (Scottish Gaelic)
Shana (English)
Shauna (English)
Shavonne (English)
Shawn (Irish)
Shawna (English)
Sheena (Scots)
Shena (Irish)
Shona (Scots)
Siân (Welsh)
Siâni (Welsh)
Sian (Irish Language)
Sina (Irish Gaelic)
Sinéidin (Irish)
Síne (Irish Gaelic)
Sinéad (Irish Gaelic)
Síneag (Scottish)
Siobhán (Irish Gaelic)
Sion (Welsh)
Sioned (Welsh)
Siubhan (Scottish Gaelic)
Vanda (Portuguese)
Vanja (Scandinavian, Slovenian)
Vanna (Italian)
Xoana (Galician)
Yana (Russian),(Slavic)
Yanick (Breton, French)
Yanna (Greek)
Yannic (Breton, French)
Yannick (Breton, French)
Yochanna (Hebrew)
Zaneta (Russian)
Žaneta (Lithuanian)
Žanna (Latvian)
Zhanna (Russian)
Zhannochka
Zsanett (Hungarian)

People with this name

Arts
Jhane Barnes (born 1954), fashion designer ("h" added as adult)
Jane Burden (1839–1914), pre-Raphaelite model and muse
Jane Antonia Cornish (born 1975), British Contemporary classical music composer
Jane Dyer (born 1949), children's book illustrator
Jane Frank (1918–1986), American artist
Jane Kelly (born 1956), artist and journalist

Crime
Jane Andrews(born 1967), murderer of Tom Cressman
Jane Britton (1945–1969), female murder victim
Jane Cakebread (1830–1898), infamous drunkard; the Inebriates Act 1898 was directly due to her case
Jane Toppan (1854–1938), American serial killer, nicknamed "Jolly Jane"

Entertainment

Jane Adams (born 1965), American actress
Jane "Poni" Adams (1921–2014), American actress
Jane Asher (born 1946), English actress and author
Jane Avril (1868–1943), French dancer
Jane Badler (born 1953), actress
Jane Birkin (born 1946), actress and singer
Jane Bryan (1918–2009), American actress
Jane Campion (born 1954), New Zealand filmmaker
Jane Curtin (born 1947), American actress and comedian
Jane Darwell (1879–1967), American actress
Jane De Leon (born 1998), Filipina actress
Jane de Wet (born 1996), South African actress
Jane Fonda (born 1937), American actress, former fitness instructor, and daughter of actor Henry Fonda
Jane Foole (fl. 1558), English court jester
Jane Garvey (born 1964), British radio presenter
Jane Goldman (born 1970), British writer and television presenter; wife of Jonathan Ross
Ellie Goulding (born 1986 as Elena Jane Goulding), British singer
Jane Greer (1924–2001), American actress
Jane Horrocks (born 1964), British actress
Jane Kaczmarek (born 1955), American actress
Jane Krakowski (born 1968), American actress
Jane Lapotaire (born 1944), English actress
Jane Leeves (born 1961), English actress
Jane Lynch (born 1960), American actress
Jane March (born 1973), English actress
Nightbirde (1990–2022) (also known as Jane Marczewski), American singer
Jane McDonald (born 1963), English singer and television star
Jane McGrath (born 1988), Irish actress
Jane McGregor (born 1983), Canadian actress
Jane Monheit (born 1977), American singer
Jane Novak (1896–1990), American actress
Jane Pickens (1907–1992), American singer and leader of The Pickens Sisters
Jane Powell (1929–2021), American actress, singer and dancer
Jane Rosenthal (born 1956), American film producer
Jane Russell (1921–2011), American actress and sex symbol
Jane Seymour (born 1951), English actress
Jane Sibbett (born 1962),  American actress
Jane Siberry (born 1955), Canadian singer/songwriter, has changed her name to "Issa"
Jane Taylor (born 1972), English musician
Jane Wiedlin (born 1958), American singer and rhythm guitarist, sometime member of the Go-Go's
Jane Winton (1905–1959), American actress, writer, dancer, painter and opera soprano
Jane Withers (1926–2021), American actress, model and singer
Jane Wyatt (1910–2006), American actress
Jane Wyman (1917–2007), American actress and ex-wife of President Ronald Reagan
Jane Zhang (born 1984), Chinese singer-songwriter

History
Calamity Jane (1852–1903), U.S. frontierswoman
Jane Addams (1860–1935), American Nobel Peace Prize-winning social worker and co-founder of Hull House
Jane Kelley Adams (1852–1924), American educator
Jane Grace Alexander (1848–1932), American banker
Jane Digby (1807–1881), English adventurer
Jane Franklin (née Griffin; 1791–1875), English explorer
Jane Gemmill (1855-?), Scottish temperance activist
Jane Horney (1918–1945), Swedish spy during WWII
Jane Roe, alias of Norma McCorvey (1947–2017), plaintiff in the landmark 1973 Roe v. Wade Supreme Court case that legalized abortion in the United States

Literature
Jane Austen (1775–1817), British novelist, known for Emma and Pride and Prejudice
Jane Bowles (1917–1973), American writer and playwright
Jane T. H. Cross (1817–1870), American author
Jane Louise Curry (born 1932), American writer
Jane Eaton Hamilton (born 1954), Canadian author
Jane Hamilton (born 1957), American author
Jane Harvey (writer) (1771–1848) British poet and novelist
Jane Jacobs (1916–2006), American-Canadian journalist, author, and urban theorist
Jane Lindskold (born 1962), American author
Jane Roberts (1929–1984), American author, poet, psychic, and spirit medium
Jane Smiley (born 1949), American novelist
Jane Agnes Stewart (1860-1944), American author, editor, and contributor to periodicals
Jane Suiter, Irish journalist and academic
Jane Taylor (1783–1824), English poet and novelist
Jane Urquhart (born 1949), Canadian novelist and poet
Jane Wilde (1821–1896), Irish poet under the pen name Speranza
Jane Wilde Hawking (born 1944), ex-wife of Stephen Hawking
Jane Yolen (born 1939), American author

News media
Jane Elliott (born 1933), American civil rights activist, known for "Blue eyes–Brown eyes" exercise.
Jane Grant (1892–1972) American journalist
Jane Hill (born 1969), British newsreader
Jane Kramer (born 1938), American journalist 
Jane Pauley (born 1950), American television journalist
Jane Pratt (born 1962), American magazine editor and publisher

Politics
Jane Harman (born 1945), member of the United States House of Representatives, representing California's 36th congressional district
Jane Irwin Harrison (1804–1845), first lady of the United States
Jane Hill (1936–2015), Australian politician
Jenny (Jane) Kenney (1884–1961) also known as Jennie, British suffragette and Montessori teacher
Jane Muskie (1927–2004), First Lady of Maine
Jane Pierce (1806–1863), first lady of the United States from 1853 to 1857
Florence Jane Short (aka Rachel Peace) (1881 – died after 1932), British feminist and suffragette
Jane Swift (born 1965), American politician, acting governor of Massachusetts from 2001-2003
Jane Lomax-Smith (born 1950), Australian politician

Religion
Jane Elizabeth Faulding (1843–1904), British Protestant Christian missionary
Jane Frances de Chantal (1572–1641), French saint

Royalty and nobility
Jane Boleyn, Viscountess Rochford (1505–1542) 
Jane Fellowes, Baroness Fellowes (born 1957)
Lady Jane Grey (1537–1554), Queen of England, also known as "Jane of England"
Jane Lane, Lady Fisher (1626–1689), played a heroic role in the escape of Charles II in 1651
Jane Loeau (1828–1873), Hawaiian noble lady
Jane Seymour (1508–1537), Queen and wife of King Henry VIII of England
Jane Spencer, Baroness Churchill (1826–1900)
Jane Wharton, 7th Baroness Wharton (1706–1761)

Science
Jane Ammons (born 1953), American industrial engineer
Jane Colden (1724–1766), American botanist
Jane Forer Gentleman (born 1940), American and Canadian statistician
Jane Goodall (born 1934), English primatologist, known for studying chimpanzees and founder of the Jane Goodall Institute
Jane Lord Hersom (1840–1928), American physician, suffragist
Jane Hutton, British statistician
Jane Loevinger (1918–2008), American developmental psychologist
Jane Luu (born 1963), Vietnamese-American astronomer and defense systems engineer
Jane McGrath (1966–2008), co-founder of the McGrath Foundation

Sport
Jane Barkman (born 1951), American swimmer
Jane Burley (born 1971), Scottish field hockey midfielder
Jane Cederqvist (1945–2023), Swedish swimmer
Jane Frederick (born 1952), American heptathlete
Jane Haist (1949–2022), Canadian discus thrower and shot putter
Jane Joseph, Trinidadian cricketer
Jane Katz (born 1943), American swimmer
Jane Patterson, Canadian judoka
Jane Salumäe (born 1968), Estonian long-distance runner
Jayne Torvill (born 1957), British ice-dancer and 1984 Olympic gold medalist with partner Christopher Dean
 Jane Weiller (1912–1989), American golfer

Fictional Janes

In law
Jane Doe or Jane Roe is used in American law as a placeholder name for anonymous or unknown female participants in legal proceedings

Jane Doe is used in United States police investigations when the identity of a female victim is unknown or incorrect, and by hospitals to refer to a female corpse or patient whose identity is unknown.

Characters in animation
 Jane Doe, on the animated series Camp Lazlo
Jane Jetson, from the animated series The Jetsons
Jane Lane, on the television show Daria
 Jane Dickey, on the short-lived series Welcome to Eltingville

Comic book characters
Jane Foster, a Marvel Comics character
Painkiller Jane, a comic book character that spawned a made-for-TV movie and a TV series

Characters in literature
Jane, an AI character first introduced in Orson Scott Card's Speaker for the Dead
Jane of the Volturi Coven, a character in the Twilight series of novels by Stephenie Meyer
Jane Crocker, a character in the webcomic Homestuck by Andrew Hussie
Dick and Jane, characters by Zerna Sharp
Jane, an entity resembling modern conceptions of AI, from the Ender's Game series
 Jane, in Jane and the Dragon franchise
 Jane, any of three characters in The P.L.A.I.N. Janes, 2007 comic & sequels, by Cecil Castellucci
Jane, Wendy Darling's daughter from J.M. Barrie's Peter Pan mythos; Jane was also the central character in the Disney Peter Pan movie sequel, Return to Neverland
Jane Banks, one of the Banks' children in the Mary Poppins books, film, and stage musical
Jane Bennet, in Pride and Prejudice, the eldest sister of the Bennet family
Jane Eyre, the titular character of a famous novel by Charlotte Brontë and several film adaptations
 Jane Gallagher, a character in The Catcher in the Rye, one of the few girls whom Holden both respects and finds attractive
Baby Jane Hudson, the titular character in the novel and film What Ever Happened to Baby Jane?
Miss Marple (first name Jane), an amateur detective created by Agatha Christie
Jane Porter, the sweetheart of Tarzan
Jayne Deverill, a Yorkshire witch in the Power of Five series by Anthony Horowitz
Jane Studdock, protagonist in That Hideous Strength by C.S. Lewis

Characters in TV, film, and theater
 Jane, on 7th Heaven
Jane Sloan, from the TV series The Bold Type
Jane Christie, from the TV series Coupling
Jane Beale (previously Collins), from the BBC soap opera EastEnders
Jayne Cobb, a male character on the sci-fi series Firefly
G.I. Jane, a 1997 war movie, with Demi Moore in the leading role
Jane Mancini, on Melrose Place and the 2009 remake
Jane Vaughn, in Degrassi: The Next Generation
 Jane Gloriana Villanueva, main character of television series Jane the Virgin
Jane Margolis, in the television series Breaking Bad
Jane Rizzoli, in the television series Rizzoli & Isles
Jane Hopper, also known as Eleven, a main character in the Netflix series Stranger Things
Jane Read, character in the Arthur book and television series

Characters in video games
Jane, a minor female character in the Tekken video game series
Jane Shepard, a playable female version of Commander Shepard in the role-playing third-person shooter Mass Effect series; "Jane Shepard" is the default name for any new female Shepard character that is built in-game, although any name can be entered
Jane Doe, a male character most commonly known as "The Soldier" in the popular class-based shooter game Team Fortress 2

In technology
 Jane, an available voice on devices from TomTom

See also
Jane (disambiguation)
Janes, the surname
Janie
Jayne
Jayna
Plain Jane (disambiguation)
Jaine

Notes

Given names of Hebrew language origin
Circassian feminine given names
English feminine given names
Scottish feminine given names
Welsh feminine given names